Borko Duronjić (born 24 September 1997) is a Serbian football forward, playing for Radnički Niš. His previous club was FK TSC Bačka Topola. Born in Banja Luka, Bosnia and Herzegovina, he was brought up in Serbia. Duronjić represents Serbia internationally having played for the Serbian U-17 team.

References

External links
 
 Borko Duronjić stats at utakmica.rs
 

1997 births
Living people
Sportspeople from Banja Luka
Serbs of Bosnia and Herzegovina
Association football forwards
Serbian footballers
Serbia youth international footballers
OFK Beograd players
FK Voždovac players
FK TSC Bačka Topola players
Serbian First League players
Serbian SuperLiga players
Bosnia and Herzegovina emigrants to Serbia